UFC 20: Battle for the Gold was a mixed martial arts event held by the Ultimate Fighting Championship on May 7, 1999 at the Boutwell Auditorium in Birmingham, Alabama. The event was seen live on pay per view in the United States, and later released on home video.

History
UFC 20 was the final event of what the UFC called "The Road to the Heavyweight Title", a tournament of sorts spanning four events, held to determine the Heavyweight Champion after Randy Couture vacated the title (due to contract disputes with the UFC). Bas Rutten defeated Kevin Randleman to become the new Heavyweight Champion in a controversial split decision. 

Referees for the event were Mario Yamasaki (first time for UFC pay-per-view) and John McCarthy.

Results

See also 
 Ultimate Fighting Championship
 List of UFC champions
 List of UFC events
 1999 in UFC

External links
UFC20 results at Sherdog.com

Ultimate Fighting Championship events
1999 in mixed martial arts
Mixed martial arts in Alabama
Sports in Birmingham, Alabama
1999 in sports in Alabama